

In the early 1960s, the United States Navy was the world's first to have nuclear-powered cruisers as part of its fleet. Commissioned in late summer 1961, she was the world's first nuclear-powered surface combatant. While Long Beach was a 'true cruiser', meaning she was designed and built as a cruiser, Bainbridge began life as a frigate, though at that time the Navy was using the hull code "DLGN" for "destroyer leader, guided missile, nuclear". This was prior to the enactment of the 1975 ship reclassification plan, in which frigates (DLG/DLGN), which were essentially large destroyers, were reclassified as cruisers, so that the US Navy's numbers would compete with those of the Soviet Navy. Long Beach, the largest of all the nuclear cruisers, was equipped with a C1W cruiser reactor, while all the others were equipped with D2G destroyer reactors.

They would commence Operation Sea Orbit, in which they circumnavigated the globe without refuelling.

In the spring of 1967 came the Navy's third nuclear-powered cruiser, (though initially labeled a frigate), a heavily modified design based on the  cruiser. The Soviets would build four in total, between 1974 and 1998.

Ultimately, nuclear-powered ships would prove to be too costly to maintain, and they would all be retired between 1993 and 1999. A fifth Virginia-class vessel was initially planned but then cancelled.

The US Navy currently has the largest fleet of nuclear-powered aircraft carriers and nuclear-powered submarines.

List of United States Navy nuclear-powered cruisers

See also

List of United States Navy ships
Nuclear propulsion
Nuclear navy
Cold war
Supercarrier
Nuclear submarine
 (World's first nuclear-powered submarine)
 (World's first nuclear-powered aircraft carrier)

References

External links

United States Navy